Egg salad is a dish made primarily of chopped hard-boiled or scrambled eggs, mustard, and mayonnaise, often including other ingredients such as celery.

It is made mixed with seasonings in the form of herbs, spices and other ingredients, bound with mayonnaise. It is similar to chicken salad, ham salad, macaroni salad, tuna salad,  lobster salad, and crab salad. A typical egg salad is made of chopped hard-boiled eggs, mayonnaise, mustard, minced celery and onion, salt, black pepper and paprika. A common use is as a filling for egg sandwiches. It is also often used as a topping for a green salad.

History
One of the earliest known printed recipes for egg salad sandwiches was published in the 1896 edition of The Boston Cooking-School Cook Book written by Fannie Farmer.

Variations 

Egg salad can be made creatively with any number of other cold foods added. Bacon, bell pepper, capers, cheese, cucumber, onions, lettuce, pickle relish, pickles, and ketchup are common additional ingredients.

A closely related sandwich filler is egg mayonnaise, wherein chopped hard-boiled egg is mixed with mayonnaise only.

A popular variant in Russia and the former Soviet states is salad Olivier.

In Jewish cuisine it is made with schmaltz, onions and sometimes gribenes. It can be served with challah as part of the first course of Shabbos dinner, or with matzo. Until the 1980s this dish was also called "Jewish eggs".

See also 
 Deviled egg
 Hard-boiled egg
 , a dish in French cuisine
 List of egg dishes
 List of salads
 List of sandwiches

References

Salads
Egg dishes
British cuisine
British salads
Irish cuisine
European cuisine
Shabbat food